= Marija Fabković =

Croatian pioneer educator and women's rights activist

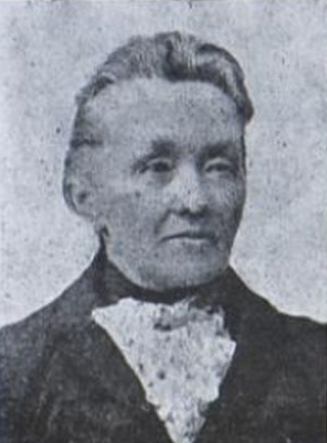
Image of Marie Fabković

Marija Fabković (1833–1915) was a Croatian pioneer educator and women's rights activist.

Fabković was a pioneer figure in the Croatian women's movement, which was dominated by female teachers.

The starting point of the women's movement in Croatia has been named as 1871, when the teachers Marija Fabković and Marija Jambrišak participated in the first Teacher's Conference in Croatia and demanded equal rights for male and female teachers and a secular school system. Marija Fabković campaigned for women teachers' right to equal salary, the right to vote on the board for communal schools, and the right to serve in county councils.

== Sources ==
- Turkalj, Jasna (2010). "Croatian women and the Party of the Right during the 1880s". Review of Croatian History. VI (1): 133–164.
